The 1987 Pacific Lutheran Lutes football team was an American football team that represented Pacific Lutheran University in the Columbia Football League (CFL) during the 1987 NAIA Division II football season. In their 16th season under head coach Frosty Westering, the Lutes compiled an 11–1–1 record and tied for the NAIA Division II national championship.

In the national championship game, the Lutes played a 16–16 tie with Wisconsin–Stevens Point. Wisconsin–Stevens Point later forfeited its share of the national championship because of its use of ineligible players.

Junior linebacker Keith Krassin was selected as the CFL Northern Division co-defensive player of the year.

The team played its home games during the regular season at Lakewood Stadium in Lakewood, Washington. For the playoffs, the team switched to Carl Sparks Stadium in Puyallup, Washington.

Coach Westering won four national championships at Pacific Lutheran (1980, 1987, 1993, and 1999) and was inducted into the College Football Hall of Fame in 2005.

Schedule

References

Pacific Lutheran
Pacific Lutheran Lutes football seasons
NAIA Football National Champions
Pacific Lutheran Lutes football